The Paradis Latin is a theater at number 28, rue du Cardinal Lemoine, in the Latin Quarter of Paris, in the fifth arrondissement, near Notre-Dame, the Panthéon, and the Tour d'Argent restaurant. The closest métro stations are Cardinal Lemoine and Jussieu.

It was first built on the rue des Fosses-Saint-Victor in 1803 and called Théâtre Latin. It burned down in 1870, but was rebuilt on the rue du Cardinal Lemoine, as Paradis Latin in 1887–1889 by Gustave Eiffel. It was closed around 1900, but was rehabilitated, starting in 1973, and reopened, in 1977, as a cabaret.
It is currently owned by businessman Walter Butler (French businessman).

History
Paradis Latin goes back to 1802, when the First Consul Napoleon Bonaparte built the Latin Theater, on the rue des Fossés-Saint-Victor, and opened in 1803.

In 1830, the Latin Theater became one of the highlights of the Parisian nights where artists, bourgeois, writers, poets, journalists, politicians, intellectuals, students, workers, merchants, aristocrats ... Honoré de Balzac, Alexandre Dumas, Alexandre Dumas fils and Prosper Mérimée were regulars. It was destroyed by a fire during the Franco-Prussian War of 1870, when Prussian Chancellor Otto von Bismarck besieged Paris. Its ruins remained for 17 years.

In 1887, during the preparation of the Paris Exhibition of 1889, Gustave Eiffel reconstructed the theater at the same time as his tower. The new hall was inaugurated on Sunday, January 20, 1889, under the name of Paradis Latin, and was a complete poster every night, presenting revues and ballets. The year of the Exposition was a happy year for the Parisian show with among others: the Mandrake, a very acclaimed piece whose heroine of the evening was Yvette Guilbert, immortalized by Toulouse Lautrec, who for several months was the star of the Song, and would become the interpreter of the composer Léon Xanrof.

As a direct competitor to Paradis Latin, cafés-concerts, more numerous than ever, all gave the same stereotyped spectacle. There was a beginning of the songs which invariably produced in front of the public, the comic-troupier, the poivrot, the gummeuse, the peasant comic, the patriotic singer. The directors of Paradis Latin then had the idea to call on acrobats, balancers, jugglers, contortionists, Chinese shadow-makers to complete and enrich their show. The new formula held only a few seasons.

In 1894, the great hall of the Paradis Latin closed its doors. Only the brasserie, starring Chopinette, a pupil of Bruant but with neither talent nor authority, and his clientele, largely made of students, did not allow him to survive beyond 1903. The immense location became a warehouse.

At the beginning of the 20th century, Montmartre is now the fashionable district of Paris. The Paradis Latin suffers from this displacement and becomes an industrial area with glassmakers and faience potters who settle there.

The glass-maker Charles Leune bought the place to install his workshop there. In 1930 a pharmaceutical company acquired it but left the place unoccupied for a long time.

In 1973, the real estate developer Jean Kriegel bought the building at 28 and 28 bis rue de Cardinal Lemoine to rehabilitate the old building into apartments. Visiting the premises, he goes from room to room, and from surprise to surprise. Eighteen thousand pipettes and other stills litter the ground, abandoned by its last owner. As the walls and false ceilings are destroyed, the imposing metal structure of Eiffel is revealed, including fragments of posters and scenery, and a Paradis Latin poster. On the first floor, workers uncover an astonishing cathedral, gilt, columns, arches, capitals and a glorious painted cupola. After discovering the theater and seduced by the place, he decided to resurrect the 720-seat cabaret according to Eiffel's original plans.

Jean-Marie Rivière, artistic director, assisted by the author Frédéric Botton, presented the first Paris Paradis show on November 14, 1977, which was a triumph. The Latin Paradise has since regained its status as a high place of the Parisian nights.

In 1979 two years after the opening of Paris Paradis, Jean-Jacques Debout and Roger Dumas created the Nuit de Paradis show for Jean-Marie Rivière.
In 1981 a new show, Paradisiac, was produced and directed by Frédéric Botton and Francis Lai, who took a leave from his musical and film career for the project.

Thierry Paulin, Jean-Thierry Mathurin, and the artist Michel Berger got their start at the theater. Arturo Brachetti, considered the best quick change performer in the world, started his career at Paradis Latin in 1979. He was the only one in the world since the legendary Leopoldo Fregoli (1867-1937).

The artistic director, Jean-Marie Rivière, eventually retired to the Antilles, but the theater continued. New shows followed, co-written and directed by Christian Dura: Champagne in 1984, then Hello Paradis in 1987, and Viva Paradis, which commemorates the hundredth anniversary of the theater.
In May 1995, a few years after the departure of his former colleague Rivière, Jean Kriegel chose to retire as well. Over nearly twenty years, he had hosted some two million spectators, with six different shows and over 1600 performances.

In 1995, the management was transferred to Sidney Israel and his son Harold.

Since 2018, the cabaret is owned by French-American businessman Walter Butler (French businessman).

In 2019, Iris Mittenaere, Miss Universe 2016, is the vedette (cabaret) of Kamel Ouali's new revue at Paradis Latin.

Revues 
1977: Paris Paradis by Jean-Marie Rivière
1979: Nuit de Paradis by Jean-Marie Rivière 
1981: Paradisiac by Francis Morane, Jean Kriegel 
1984: Champagne by Christian Dura, Jean Kriegel
1987: Hello Paradis by Christian Dura, Jean Kriegel
1990: Viva Paradis by Philippe Rondest
2001: Paradis d'Amour by Christian Dura 
2008: Paradis à la folie by Christian Dura
2019: L'Oiseau Paradis by Kamel Ouali

Gallery

See also
 Revue
 Jubilee!
 Peepshow
 Sirens of TI
 Absinthe
 Moulin Rouge
 Le Lido
 Folies Bergère
 Casino de Paris
 Cabaret Red Light
 Tropicana Club
 Iris Mittenaere (Miss Universe 2016)

References

External links
Paradis Latin's Website
 paradislatincabaret - YouTube
 
 
 
  FranceTVinfo.fr

Theatres in Paris
Theatres completed in 1889
Tourist attractions in Paris
Buildings and structures in the 5th arrondissement of Paris